Handorf is a municipality in the district of Lüneburg, in Lower Saxony, Germany.

The headquarters of the music publishing company Lugert Verlag GmbH who produce the Forte scorewriter program are located in the municipality.

References

Lüneburg (district)